Mikil  (Mikil') is a town in Atyrau Region, western Kazakhstan.

References

Atyrau Region
Cities and towns in Kazakhstan